St. Maximilian is a Roman Catholic parish church of the Isar suburb in Munich, southern Germany. St. Maximilian is located on the banks of the Isar, facing the tower of the Deutsches Museum.

References

External links 

 Official Website of St Maximilian
 Photo spread of St Maximilian

Maximilian
Religious buildings and structures completed in 1908
1908 establishments in Germany
Cultural heritage monuments in Munich